La Usurpadora (English: The Usurper; international title: Deceptions) is a Mexican romantic drama telenovela produced by Salvador Mejia Alejandre and originally broadcast on Canal de las Estrellas from February 9 to July 24, 1998. 

It starred Gabriela Spanic and Fernando Colunga, and was based on La Intrusa, a novela originally broadcast in Venezuela which was itself a remake of Radio Caracas Television's 1971 telenovela La Usurpadora, which starred Marina Baura and Raúl Amundaray. This was one of the last telenovelas to feature Libertad Lamarque, who here portrayed the character of Abuela Piedad Bracho, until Carita de ángel. 

Inspired by the book The Scapegoat (Du Maurier novel).revolves around a pair of twin sisters who were separated when they were young, and as adults the younger sister is forced to act as a "replacement" for her wealthy twin who wants to temporarily leave her husband and his family to enjoy a life of luxury with multiple lovers. The telenovela had huge success in Mexico with ratings of 38.4 and has been exported and dubbed in various languages across the world.

It was the first on-screen collaboration between Colunga and Spanic, who both later worked in Soy tu Dueña.

Plot
Paola and Paulina are twins who were separated at birth. Paulina is a good-hearted and honest woman who lives in poverty and is engaged to a simple man, Osvaldo (who's seeing another woman). Paola, on the other hand, is a rich, frivolous and evil woman who has many lovers, including her brother-in-law, Willy. She is married to Carlos Daniel Bracho, a wealthy man.

When the twins cross paths by chance, Paola attempts to convince Paulina into taking her place at the Brachos' house, so she can take a year-long vacation with her new lover, Alessandro. At first, Paulina refuses because she can't leave her deathly ill mother; but she's later blackmailed and threatened with jail after Paola puts her bracelet in Paulina's purse and accuses her of theft. Abandoned by her fiancé Osvaldo who leaves her to be with his mistress and left with nothing after the death of her mother, Paulina submits to Paola's plan. She is, however, unaware of the destruction the Bracho household was under (thanks to Paola) and decides to work throughout the year righting all wrongs. Paulina (posing as Paola) strives to convince everyone that she has "changed" and become a "new person". During the year, Paulina falls in love with Carlos Daniel. She cures Piedad from alcoholism, saves the Bracho factory from financial ruin, and cuts ties with all of Paola's lovers. No matter how hard she tries, she can't make peace with Estefania (Carlos Daniel's sister) because the real Paola had an affair with Willy, Estefania's husband. Nonetheless, she continues to try to make amends.

Paulina, being the honorable and decent woman that she is, refuses to be intimate with Carlos Daniel, telling him that she needs a year due to her "illness". Carlos  Daniel, unaware she is not really Paola, resents her and falls back into the arms of Gema, Paola's frenemy, who's always trying to seduce Carlos Daniel, encouraged by Estefania.

Meanwhile, the real Paola is in Monaco partying with Alessandro. One night after a party, Paola, scared because she had previously dreamt this would happen, gets in a car crash with Alessandro in the passenger seat. They end up in a hospital in Monaco, where she spends months and recovers after multiple surgeries, although her lover Alessandro ends up paralyzed and is reliant on a wheelchair. Paola, no longer interested in him, plans her return to Mexico to take back her place as the real Paola Bracho.

Paola's plan is discovered and Paulina escapes from Mexico, but Carlos Daniel's son, Carlitos, tries to find Paulina, who he thinks is his real mother. With a broken foot, he falls from a hill, hits his head on a rock, and loses his memory. An old lady finds him and cures him.

Paola returns and restarts wreaking havoc: she finds out that Carlitos and Paulina are missing. Eventually, Paulina hears about Carlitos and returns to the Bracho House. Paola goes to travel the world with her famous lover Douglas Maldonado, so Paulina pretends to be Paola again because Carlos Daniel's grandmother Piedad doesn't want Paulina to go to jail. Paulina tells the whole family that Carlos Daniel hated Paulina at first, but after finding Carlitos, they both share their secret love for each other. Gema and Willy contact the Police. Willy beats Estefania up and she is hospitalized. Estefania doesn't turn Paulina to the authorities, after Paulina donates blood to her and her baby. Estefania later reconciles with Paulina.

On the same day, Paola eventually returns, pretending to be paralyzed and trying to take her place back. The next day, Paulina is arrested. While in prison, Paulina and Carlos Daniel discover a mysterious letter by Paulina's mother, written before she died. In the letter, it is explained that Paola and Paulina are twins, but were separated at birth. Paola is caught standing on her feet, putting on make-up, by her nurse Elvira. Paola tells her she will give her money to keep her mouth shut. When Paola finds out that Paulina is her twin, she gets furious. Many men come forward to help hire a lawyer for Paulina so she can be free. Later, Paulina is cleared of all charges. Paola decides to go to the Bracho house with Elvira. Paulina takes Carlitos to her hotel to avoid Paola, so Paola stays in a wheelchair to prove that she is disabled.

Returning to her old ways, Paola inflicts damage on the family and on Paulina. Later, the whole Bracho family is horrified to see Paola walk. Elvira tells the whole family the truth about Paola never being paralyzed. Paola overhears this, so she and Willy set out to get revenge on Paulina, Carlos Daniel and Paulina's lawyer because she was set free. They also plot to kill Elvira for being a traitor. Paola takes Elvira away to kill her but, while in the car travelling at a high speed, Paola reveals to Elvira that she overheard her snitching and she is going to die because of it. Elvira tries to stop the car but they lose control whilst speeding up and the car hits a wall, rolling violently down a hill, where it explodes. Carlos Daniel arrives to the Bracho house. Farmers discover the wreckage of the car and Elvira's corpse. Paola however is found alive in a critical state. Everyone later finds out about Paola's car accident.

Paola is transferred to a Central Hospital. There, she tells everyone the truth about her plan with Willy. The police arrests Willy and he's sentenced to 8 years in prison. Paola is forgiven by her sister and her husband, and dies. Paulina is finally free to marry Carlos Daniel, and peace is finally restored at the Bracho house.

Production
Gabriela Spanic has a twin sister in real life, Daniela Spanic, who is a Venezuelan model. Daniela was approached by the producers of the show to appear in one scene where Paola and Paulina physically fight, as the sequence would have been too difficult to achieve by camera trickery.
La Usurpadora was nicknamed in Spanish, "The queen of the ratings" while broadcast for Univision in 2000. Although the Mexican telenovela garnered massive ratings, it received no awards from the yearly award shows.
La Usurpadora wasn't the first of Spanic's telenovela playing twins, she had already played two identical women in Como Tu, Ninguna but they were non-relative as in La Usurpadora. She played the roles just in the last stage of the story. Gabriela later starred in Televisa's 2001 La Intrusa where she once again took on roles similar to La usurpadora, except both sisters were good characters.

Impact
La Usurpadora has become one of the most exported Televisa telenovelas, has been licensed by 125 countries in and dubbed into 25 languages.

Remake
A remake, ¿Quién Eres Tú? (Who Are You?), premiered on the Unimás network (formerly Telefutura) as part of its relaunch. It starred Laura Carmine and Julian Gil. It premiered on January 7, 2013, but was removed from the network's lineup a week later due to poor ratings. It was replaced in its timeslot by a rebroadcast of Rosario Tijeras. Only ten episodes were aired on Unimás. Although the network has not made an official statement as to the telenovela's fate, it is presumed it has been cancelled.

Sequel

La Usurpadora was followed by a two-hour special, Más Alla De La Usurpadora which is set a year after the events of the original telenovela. Again produced by Salvador Mejia Alejandre and directed by Beatriz Sheridan, it starred many familiar cast members, including Gabriela Spanic and Fernando Colunga, and introduced a new character, Raquel, played by Yadhira Carrillo.

Synopsis
Paulina and Carlos Daniel are blissfully happy with their new baby girl, Paulita. Problems arise when Paulina falls ill and consults a doctor who tells her that she has cancer and will die in a few months. Paulina keeps her illness a secret from her family, but asks Raquel, Paulita's caregiver, to marry Carlos Daniel after she dies. Raquel, who has been secretly in love with Carlos Daniel, is delighted. 
When Paulina lets Abuela Piedad in on her secret, Abuela Piedad insists that her family deserves to know. Paulina has a panic attack, and sees a vision of Paola in a mirror, telling her that she will see her in hell for robbing her of her family. When Carlos Daniel learns of her illness, he comforts Paulina and they decide to make the best of the time they have remaining together. 
Raquel cannot wait to take over Paulina's role, so she puts poison in Paulina's wine. Paulina drinks and immediately faints, but Raquel faints as well. Both women are taken to the hospital, where they learn that Paulina is not sick, but is in fact pregnant. However, Raquel has accidentally swallowed the poison; she seeks forgiveness and eventually makes a full recovery. 
Back at the Bracho home, Carlos Daniel and Paulina reveal the happy news to everyone. Overjoyed, the family takes a picture and it says "And they lived happily for the rest of their lives". The credits roll and the audience cheers.

Cast

Awards and nominations

References

External links 

 Fans Telenovela La Usurpadora

1998 telenovelas
1998 Mexican television series debuts
1998 Mexican television series endings
Mexican telenovelas
Televisa telenovelas
Spanish-language telenovelas
Television shows set in Cancún
Television shows set in Mexico City
Television shows set in Monterrey
Television shows set in Acapulco
Television shows set in Monaco
Television shows set in Paris
Television shows set in Hawaii
Television series about twins